Paragon Software Group is a German software company that develops hard drive management software, low-level file system drivers and storage technologies. The Smart Handheld Device Division (SHDD) offers multilingual dictionaries, multilingual handwriting recognition, weather information, and two-way data synchronization with desktop devices.

Overview
The company is headquartered in Freiburg im Breisgau, Germany, with offices in the US, China, Japan, Poland, and Russia.

The company was established in 1994 by a group of Moscow Institute of Physics and Technology (MIPT) students, including founder/CEO Konstantin Komarov. A separate mobile division, called the Mobility Division, was formed in 1995. The German office opened in 1998, the Swiss office in 2000.

History
In 2004, the company started working with Fujitsu-Siemens on its handheld PCs Russian localization. Next year, the company expanded the product line of office and gaming applications for Symbian OS and received the "Developer of the Year" award in the Handango Champion Awards 2005.

In 2011, PCMag recognized the company's flagship Paragon Hard Disk Manager as the best hard drive management program. Paragon Software Group also won Global Telecoms Business Innovation Award 2011 for their mobile product.

Products 
Paragon Software Group is serving two markets:

 Data security and storage management – disaster recovery and server optimization.
 Software for smartphones – multilingual on-line handwriting recognition, localization, business and productivity applications, games, 120 multilingual dictionaries, and encyclopedias.

Data security and storage management

 Paragon Hard Disk Manager, including a tool named  for resizing partitions.
 Paragon File System Link (proprietary)
 File system drivers, including Paragon NTFS for Mac and APFS for Windows.

Software for smartphones

Slovoed
Slovoed is a dictionary and phrasebook app available for more than 37 world languages.

It incorporates more than 350 electronic dictionaries, encyclopedias and phrase books developed in conjunction with Duden, Langenscheidt, Oxford UP, PONS/Klett, Le Robert, VOX, and other publishing houses.

PenReader 
PenReader is a real-time handwriting recognition technology for touchscreens with support for 17 languages. The technology is used in a number of prominent iOS and Android applications, such as Evernote, Handwriting Dato and Handwrite Note Free, MyScript Calculator. A 2016 MacWorld review of PenReader was headlined "Disappointing" and added "When it comes to handwriting recognition, PenReader isn't particularly accurate, intuitive, or easy to use."

Distribution channels
Paragon distributes online through the company website, a network of value-added resellers, distributors and OEMs.

The global partnerships of Paragon Software Group include ASUS, Avast, Belkin, D-Link, HP, Intel, Microsoft, Netgear, Nvidia, Realtek, Seagate, Siemens, Technicolor, Telechips, Western Digital, Wyplay.

See also
 PTS/DOS (PTS=PhysTechSoft; the "P" is also a hint to Paragon)

References

German companies established in 1994
Privately held companies of Germany
Software companies of Germany